Charles Ferguson (22 April 1930 – April 2017) was a Scottish professional footballer, who played as a right back in the Football League.

References

Sources

1930 births
2017 deaths
Footballers from Glasgow
Scottish footballers
Heart of Midlothian F.C. players
Accrington Stanley F.C. (1891) players
Oldham Athletic A.F.C. players
Rochdale A.F.C. players
Hamilton Academical F.C. players
Rossendale United F.C. players
English Football League players
Scottish Football League players
Benburb F.C. players
Association football fullbacks